Intra is the third album by avant-garde metal band Ram-Zet released on September 6, 2005 in the US by Tabu Records. It was produced by the band's founder, vocalist, and guitarist, Zet and co-produced by Ram-Zet and Daniel Bergstrand, who also mixed the album. The band recorded at their personal studio in Norway, Space Valley Studios.

Track listing
 "Final Thrill" – 5:26
 "Left Behind as Pieces" – 4:51
 "Enchanted" – 7:05
 "Ballet" – 6:42
 "Peace" – 2:06
 "And Innocence" – 5:31
 "Born" – 6:05
 "Lullaby for the Dying" – 6:36
 "Closing a Memory" – 9:13

Credits

Ram-Zet 
 Henning "Zet" Ramseth – vocals, guitar, music, lyrics, arranging, co-producer
 Miriam Elisabeth "Sfinx" Renvåg – vocals, lyrics
 Ingvild "Sareeta" Johannesen – violin, backing vocals
 Küth – drums
 Magnus Østvang – keyboards
 Jon Daniel – bass

Additional musicians and production 
 Ram-Zet – arranging, co-producer 
 Space Valley Studios – recording studio
 Daniel Bergstrand at DUG-OUT productions – co-producer, mixing
 Peter In de Betou at Tailor Maid – mastering
 Toril Cecilie Skaaraas – photography
 Raymond Alv Kristiansen Egge – photography
 Terje Johnsen – artwork

2005 albums
Ram-Zet albums
Concept albums
Tabu Records albums